Vagarosa is the second album of Brazilian singer/songwriter Céu. It was produced by Urban Jungle in 2009. Released on 7 July 2009 by Six Degrees Records in the USA/UK/Germany and by Universal Music in Brazil.

Track listing

Release history

References

2009 albums
Céu albums